Kobresia is a genus of plants in the sedge family. They are sometimes called bog sedges. These perennial sedges are quite similar to Carex species in appearance. The genus is widespread across much of Europe, Asia and North America, with many species native to the Himalayas.

Species

Kobresia burangensis Y.C.Yang – Tibet
Kobresia capillifolia (Decne.) C.B.Clarke – Central Asia, Himalayas, Tuva region of Siberia, Mongolia, central and western China including Tibet and Xinjiang
Kobresia cercostachys (Franch.) C.B.Clarke – Eastern Himalayas, Nepal, Bhutan, Tibet, Yunnan
Kobresia condensata (Kük.) S.R.Zhang & Noltie – Sichuan, Yunnan
Kobresia cuneata Kük – Tibet to central China
Kobresia curticeps (C.B.Clarke) Kük. in H.G.A.Engler – Tibet, Nepal, Bhutan
Kobresia curvirostris (C.B.Clarke) C.B.Clarke in J.D.Hooker – Bhutan, Arunachal Pradesh, Thailand
Kobresia duthiei C.B.Clarke in J.D.Hooker – Tibet, Nepal, Bhutan, northern and eastern India
Kobresia esbirajbhandarii Rajbh. & H.Ohba – Nepal
Kobresia esenbeckii (Kunth) Noltie – Tibet, Yunnan, Nepal, Bhutan, northern and eastern India, Myanmar
Kobresia falcata F.T.Wang & Tang ex P.C.Li – Sichuan, Gansu
Kobresia filicina (C.B.Clarke) C.B.Clarke in J.D.Hooker – Tibet, Nepal, Bhutan, northern and eastern India
Kobresia filifolia (Turcz.) C.B.Clarke – Siberia, Mongolia, Gansu, Hebei, Inner Mongolia, Qinghai, Shanxi
Kobresia fissiglumis C.B.Clarke in J.D.Hooker – Tibet, Yunnan, Nepal, Bhutan, northern and eastern India
Kobresia fragilis C.B.Clarke – Nepal, Bhutan, Tibet, Qinghai, Sichuan, Yunnan, Sikkim
Kobresia gammiei C.B.Clarke – Nepal, Bhutan, Tibet
Kobresia gandakiensis Rajbh. & H.Ohba – Nepal, Sikkim
Kobresia graminifolia C.B.Clarke – Nepal, Gansu, Qinghai, Shaanxi, Sichuan, Tibet, Yunnan 
Kobresia harae Rajbh. & H.Ohba – Nepal
Kobresia hohxilensis R.F.Huang in S.G.Wu & Z.J.Feng – Gansu, Qinghai, Tibet
Kobresia humilis (C.A.Mey. ex Trautv.) Serg. in V.L.Komarov – Caucasus, Turkey, Iraq, Iran, Afghanistan, Central Asia, Himalayas, Nepal, Pakistan, Tibet, Xinjiang, Mongolia
Kobresia inflata P.C.Li in S.Y.Jin & Y.L.Chen – Bhutan, Tibet, Yunnan
Kobresia kanaii Rajbh. & H.Ohba – Nepal
Kobresia kansuensis Kük – Nepal, Bhutan, Tibet, Gansu, Qinghai, Shaanxi, Sichuan, Yunnan 
Kobresia karakorumensis Dickoré – Tajikistan, Afghanistan, Pakistan, Kashmir, Tibet, Xinjiang
Kobresia kobresioidea (Kük.) J.Kern – Sumatra
Kobresia kuekenthaliana Hand.-Mazz. – Sichuan
Kobresia laxa Nees in R.Wight – Tajikistan, Afghanistan, Pakistan, Kashmir, Tibet, Bhutan
Kobresia littledalei C.B.Clarke – Sichuan, Tibet
Kobresia loliacea F.T.Wang & Tang ex P.C.Li – Tibet, Yunnan
Kobresia macrantha Boeckeler – Gansu, Qinghai, Sichuan, Xinjiang, Nepal, Tibet
Kobresia macrolepis Meinsh. – Caucasus
Kobresia mallae Rajbh. & H.Ohba – Nepal
Kobresia myosuroides (Vill.) Fiori in A.Fiori & al. – northern and central Europe and Asia from Spain and Iceland to Korea and the Kuril Islands, including Siberia, China, Scandinavia, Germany, Italy, etc.; also Greenland, Alaska, much of Canada and the mountains of the Western United States
Kobresia nepalensis (Nees) Kük. in H.G.A.Engler – Himalayas from Pakistan to Bhutan; Tibet, Yunnan
Kobresia nitens C.B.Clarke – Pakistan, Nepal, northern India
Kobresia prainii Kük – Nepal, Tibet, Bhutan
Kobresia pusilla N.A.Ivanova – Gansu, Hebei, Inner Mongolia, Qinghai, Sichuan, Tibet
Kobresia pygmaea (C.B.Clarke) C.B.Clarke in J.D.Hooker – much of China; Himalayas from Pakistan to Myanmar
Kobresia rcsrivastavae Jana – Uttarakhand
Kobresia robusta Maxim. – Mongolia, Gansu, Qinghai, Xinjiang, Tibet
Kobresia royleana (Nees) Boeckeler – Central Asia, Himalayas, Nepal, Bhutan, Gansu, Qinghai, Sichuan, Xinjiang, Tibet, Yunnan Afghanistan, Himachal Pradesh, Uttarakhand
Kobresia sanguinea (Boott) Raymond – Pakistan, Kashmir
Kobresia schoenoides (C.A.Mey.) Steud – Caucasus, Iran, Central Asia, Himalayas, China
Kobresia setschwanensis Hand.-Mazz. – Gansu, Qinghai, Sichuan, Tibet, Yunnan
Kobresia sibirica (Turcz.) Boeckeler – Arctic Russia, Mongolia, Alaska, Arctic Canada, British Columbia, Colorado, Wyoming
Kobresia sikkimensis Kük. in H.G.A.Engler – Sikkim, Tibet, Nepal, Bhutan, Assam
Kobresia simpliciuscula (Wahlenb.) Mack. – northern and central Europe from Britain and Spain to Kamchatka; Alaska, Greenland, much of Canada, mountains of western United States
Kobresia smirnovii N.A.Ivanova – Altai, Kazakhstan, Mongolia
Kobresia squamiformis Y.C.Yang – Sikkim, Tibet, Gansu
Kobresia tibetica Maxim. – Tibet, Xinjiang, Gansu, Qinghai, Sichuan
Kobresia tunicata Hand.-Mazz. – Sichuan, Yunnan
Kobresia uncinioides (Boott) C.B.Clarke in J.D.Hooker – Nepal, Bhutan, Myanmar, Tibet, Yunnan
Kobresia vaginosa C.B.Clarke in J.D.Hooker – Nepal, Bhutan, Tibet, Yunnan
Kobresia vidua (Boott ex C.B.Clarke) Kük. in H.G.A.Engler – Nepal, Bhutan, Tibet, Yunnan, Gansu, Qinghai, Sichuan
Kobresia woodii Noltie – Bhutan, Tibet
Kobresia yadongensis Y.C.Yang – Tibet
Kobresia yangii S.R.Zhang – Sichuan

References

External links
Jepson Manual Treatment
USDA Plants Profile
Flora of Pakistan

Cyperaceae
Cyperaceae genera